Sikenička is a village and municipality in the Nové Zámky District in the Nitra Region of south-west Slovakia.

History
In historical records the village was first mentioned in 1135.

Geography
The municipality lies at an altitude of 149 metres and covers an area of 13.916 km². It has a population of about 475 people.

Ethnicity
The population is about 91% Hungarian and 8% Slovak.

Facilities
The village has a small public library and football pitch.

External links
 http://www.statistics.sk/mosmis/eng/run.html
 Sikenička – Nové Zámky Okolie

Villages and municipalities in Nové Zámky District